Tarawa Beachhead is a 1958 war film directed by Paul Wendkos. It stars Columbia Pictures contract star Kerwin Mathews in his first leading role and the husband and wife team of Ray Danton and Julie Adams.  The working title of the film was Flag over Tarawa and was originally to have starred Ronald Reagan.

Plot
Sgt. Tom Sloan sees his Lieutenant Joel Brady kill one of their own Marines, Johnny Campbell on Guadalcanal after Brady led a disastrous suicidal attack against Japanese entrenched in caves. As the only survivors of the debacle, Sloan does not turn Brady in as he assumes that no one will believe his word against an officer's.  With Brady's recommendation, Sloan is later commissioned and assigned as an aide to a general (Onslow Stevens) back in the 2nd Marine Division headquarters in New Zealand.

Lt. Sloan meets Campbell's widow, Ruth (Julie Adams) to bring her letters written by Johnny.  However he meets Brady who is keeping company with Ruth's sister (Karen Sharpe).

Sloan lands on Tarawa with Brady, now a Captain; each hating each other more than the Japanese.

Cast
Kerwin Mathews as Sergeant (later Lieutenant) Thomas A. 'Tom' Sloan
Julie Adams as Ruth Nelson Campbell
Ray Danton as Lieutenant (later Captain) Joel Brady
Karen Sharpe as Paula Nelson
Onslow Stevens as General Nathan Keller

Production
The film was said to contain extensive amounts of actual footage of the Battle of Tarawa. While some actual footage was used, most of the supposed actual footage were from the 1943 film Guadalcanal Diary and the 1949 film, Sands of Iwo Jima. The United States Marine Corps refused to cooperate with the producers, due to the theme of an officer out for glory killing his own men and a sergeant out for revenge.

References

External links

1958 films
1950s war films
American World War II films
Columbia Pictures films
Films about the United States Marine Corps
American black-and-white films
Films set in Kiribati
Films set in New Zealand
Films set in the Solomon Islands
Pacific War films
Films directed by Paul Wendkos
Battle of Tarawa
Films produced by Charles H. Schneer
1950s English-language films